Jonathan Mendes (born 19 July 1989 in Décines-Charpieu, Rhône) is a French footballer.

Career
He was trained at the youth academy of Olympique lyonnais before moving to AJ Auxerre and played some matches for the reserve team. He joined Standard de Liège in June 2009 and was loaned out in January 2010 to AFC Tubize. He made his professional debut for AFC Tubize on 6 February 2010 against KV Turnhout in the EXQI League and was loaned again0 on 16 May 2010 for one season to AFC Tubize.

References

1989 births
Living people
People from Décines-Charpieu
French people of Portuguese descent
French footballers
French expatriate footballers
Olympique Lyonnais players
AJ Auxerre players
AS Beauvais Oise players
Belgian Pro League players
Standard Liège players
Expatriate footballers in Belgium
A.F.C. Tubize players
Getafe CF B players
French expatriate sportspeople in Belgium
Expatriate footballers in Spain
French expatriate sportspeople in Spain
Association football defenders
Sportspeople from Lyon Metropolis
Footballers from Auvergne-Rhône-Alpes